WDCF (1350 AM) is a radio station broadcasting a talk radio/adult standards  format. Licensed to Dade City, Florida, United States, the station is currently owned by Wagenvoord Advertising Group, Inc.

WDCF is a part of the Tan Talk Radio Network, whose programming can also be heard on WTAN AM 1340 in Clearwater, Florida , WZHR AM 1400 in Zephyrhills, Florida and translator station W272EH 102.3 FM Dade City.

External links
wdcf.tantalknetwork.com

DCF
DCF
1954 establishments in Florida
Radio stations established in 1954
DCF